is a railway station in the city of Oga, Akita Prefecture, Japan, operated by East Japan Railway Company (JR East).

Lines

Station layout
The station has one side platform serving a single bi-directional track. The station building also houses a "Newdays" convenience store and is staffed.

History
Funakoshi Station was opened on November 8, 1914 as a station on the Japanese Government Railways (JGR) serving the town of Funakoshi, Akita. The JGR became the JNR (Japan National Railways) after World War II. With the privatization of the JNR on April 1, 1987, the station has been managed by JR East.

Passenger statistics
In fiscal 2018, the station was used by an average of 566 passengers daily (boarding passengers only).

Surrounding area
Funakoshi Post Office

See also
 List of railway stations in Japan

References

External links

JR East station information page 

Railway stations in Japan opened in 1914
Railway stations in Akita Prefecture
Oga Line
Oga, Akita